Bill Fay is the debut studio album by English singer-songwriter Bill Fay, released in 1970 by Deram Records. The album was re-released in 2005 with the addition of the 1967 single "Some Good Advice" and its b-side "Screams in the Ears". The album cover features a photograph of Fay stood in water beside a lake in Hyde Park.

Track listing

References
 Allmusic.com
 Head Heritage

1970 albums
Deram Records albums
Bill Fay albums